Let Mother Earth Speak is a collaboration album, by Japanese new age musician Kitaro and Native American activist Dennis Banks.

It was released on September 11, 2012. Let Mother Earth Speak is included in the article "Best Instrumental Album 2012" of New Age Music World.

Track listing

References

External links
 Kitaro Official site (English)
 Let Mother Earth Speak Official Facebook

Kitarō albums
2012 albums